Seongbok Station is a metro station located in Seongbok-dong, Suji-gu, Yongin, Gyeonggi-do, South Korea. The station has a popular cafe street and shopping mall called Day Park directly in front of Exit 4.

A large Lotte shopping mall larger than COEX in scale, is scheduled to be built between Exits 1 and 2, slated for opening in September 2019.

References

Seoul Metropolitan Subway stations
Metro stations in Yongin
Railway stations opened in 2016